Ghobeyra (also Romanized as Ghobeyrā and Ghobīrā’; also known as Ghoveyrā, Ghubera, Qabīrā, and Qobeyrā) is a village in Negar Rural District, in the Central District of Bardsir County, Kerman Province, Iran. At the 2006 census, its population was 335, in 69 families.

References 

Populated places in Bardsir County